Dibrugarh–Amritsar Express is a weekly Express train that connects Dibrugarh, the "Tea City of India" in the east with the "Golden city" Amritsar in the north.

Timetable 
Train no. 15933, the Dibrugarh to Amritsar leaves Dibrugarh every Tuesday at 07:00 hours and reaches Amritsar every Thursday at 21:05 hours.
Train no. 15934 from Amritsar to Dibrugarh leaves Amritsar every Friday at 15:45 hours and reaches Dibrugarh every Monday at 04:55 hours traveling a distance of 2853.5 kilometres in 61 hours and 10 minutes.

Route & Halts

ASSAM
  (Starts)
 
 
 
 

NAGALAND
 

WEST BENGAL
 
 
 New Jalpaiguri (Siliguri)

BIHAR
 
 
 
 
 
 

UTTAR PRADESH 
 
 
 
 
 

 
 
 
 

HARYANA
 

PUNJAB
 
 
 
  (Ends)

Traction

Diesel Loco Shed, Siliguri-based WDM-3A / WDP-4D/WDP-4 locomotive.
Electric Loco Shed, Ghaziabad-based WAP-7 locomotive.

See Also
New Jalpaiguri - Amritsar Clone Superfast Express
New Jalpaiguri–Amritsar Karmabhoomi Express

References

Transport in Dibrugarh
Transport in Amritsar
Express trains in India
Rail transport in Assam
Rail transport in Punjab, India
Rail transport in Uttar Pradesh
Rail transport in Nagaland
Rail transport in Haryana
Rail transport in Bihar
Rail transport in West Bengal
Railway services introduced in 2003